Part of the AFI 100 Years... series, AFI's 100 Years...100 Laughs is a list of the top 100 funniest movies in American cinema. A wide variety of comedies, totalling 500 films, were nominated for the distinction; genres included slapstick, action comedy, screwball comedy, romantic comedy, satire, black comedy, musical comedy, comedy of manners, and comedy of errors. The list was unveiled by the American Film Institute on June 13, 2000.

Cary Grant has the most appearances on the list, with eight films.

Criteria
According to the AFI, the criteria for nomination are:

List of films

References

AFI 100 Years... series
Lists of comedy films
Centennial anniversaries